Bishops Lydeard railway station is a heritage railway station in the village of Bishops Lydeard, Somerset, England. It is the southern terminus for regular trains on the West Somerset Railway.

History

B&ER/GWR
On opening the station had just one platform on the line's west side, with goods facilities consisting of a siding to a goods shed on the west, and a passing loop plus two sidings on the northeast was served by a passing loop and two sidings. There was also a house for the station master.

The B&ER became part of the Great Western Railway in 1876, but the West Somerset Railway remained an independent company until 1922 when the Great Western absorbed it.

The second eastern platform was not added until 1906, together with a connecting foot bridge. The standard-pattern GWR medium-scale signal box was also added at the end of the platform, operated via a 25 lever stud-locking frame. On 10 June 1936 the line was doubled from here to Norton Fitzwarren, resulting in the signal box being upgraded to a 32 lever frame.

British Railways
Nationalisation in 1948 saw it become a part of the Western Region of British Railways. On 1 March 1970 the signal box was closed and its frame removed, and the track from Norton Fitzwarren through Bishop’s Lydeard and as far as Williton was operated as a single track. The station was closed by BR, along with the entire line, on 4 January 1971.

West Somerset Railway
After the entire line and its trackbed were bought by Somerset County Council, the West Somerset Railway agreed to lease the line as a heritage railway, with the later possibility of operating timetabled service trains into  via operating company, the WSR plc. Track remains to Norton Fitzwarren, controlled through a single token and colour light signals, to allow special trains and occasional goods trains to operate through from Network Rail to the WSR.

Initially the section west of Williton was operated as one-train-only, before the WSR began operating Bishops Lydeard as a terminus. HM Railway Inspectorate approved the new plans in 1997, and the full system including control of the Norton Fitzwarren section came into use from August 1998.

Description

Today the station has two operational platforms. It is the headquarters of the West Somerset Railway Association which provides volunteer support for the railway and the Associations's Quantock Belle dining car train is based here.

The original south western No.1 platform, was extended yet further towards Taunton by the WSR to allow for dual-platform departure. The old goods shed has been restored and is used as a visitor centre and museum; its artefacts includes a GWR sleeping car, and the Taunton Model Railway Club’s model railway layout. The original station offices with modern toilets are now used by the West Somerset Railway Association.

The northern 1906-built platform, No.2, is today the stations main operating platform. Accessed via a carpark to its rear, it contains the ticket office, toilets and a shop, and the now enclosed signal box, with a similar platform extension towards Taunton. This extension provided for the inclusion of the Taunton-facing platform No.3 but this is only operated as a siding as it has no direct connection to the running lines. It is normally used to house the "Quantock Belle" dining cars.

The northern locomotive stabling yard is also based here (northeast of No.2, not accessible to the public), which is where visiting locomotives arriving by road are unloaded onto the WSR.

Services

In 2019, the WSR entered into a partnership with the modern Great Western Railway (GWR) to operate services to Bishops Lydeard  on occasional summer Saturdays from  beginning on 27 July 2019 which ended on October 5th 2019.

Access
For those outside the area, Bishops Lydeard is the WSR main access point:
Bus: Service from Taunton serves Bishops Lydeard station directly.
Car: Sign posted from junctions 25 or 26 of the M5 motorway, the station is located just off the A358 road on the opposite side to the village. There is a large free car park adjacent to station platform 2.

References

External links

 Bishops Lydeard station on the West Somerset Railway website

West Somerset Railway
Heritage railway stations in Somerset
Railway stations in Great Britain opened in 1862
Railway stations in Great Britain closed in 1971
Railway stations in Great Britain opened in 1979
Former Great Western Railway stations
Museums in Somerset
Railway museums in England
1862 establishments in England